Hyderabad district is a most populous district in the state of Telangana in India that contains a part of the metropolitan area of Hyderabad. It is headed by a district collector who is drawn from the IAS cadre and is appointed by the state government. It is the smallest of all the districts in the state, but has the highest human density. Old MCH area, which is central region of Hyderabad city comes under this district.The district share boundaries with Rangareddy and Medhchal districts.

History 

Hyderabad district was formed in 1948 after Operation Polo by merging Atraf-a-Balda District and Baghat District. Baghat was previously a Taluk in Atraf-e-Balda District, and was made a separate district in 1931–34 under the subedar of Medak division. After formation of Andhra Pradesh by merging Telugu speaking of Hyderabad state in 1956 Hyderabad district boundary was altered Tandur Taluka which is Telugu speaking region of Gulbarga district was merged in Hyderabad district and Parigi Taluka of Mahabubnagar district and Vikarabad Taluka of Medak District also merged in Hyderabad district. In 1978 Hyderabad district was later split into Hyderabad Urban District and Hyderabad Rural District.Hyderabad Urban District was made by 4 Talukas are Charminar, Golkonda, Mushirabad and Secunderabad Talukas. Hyderabad rural district was later renamed as Ranga Reddy District. Hyderabad Urban district subdivided in 16 Mandals in 1985 and consist of 2 Revenue division

Administrative divisions 

Hyderabad District includes the area of the core area Greater Hyderabad Municipal Corporation, Secunderabad Cantonment, and Osmania University. There are 16 administrative areas called mandals (or tehsils) in Hyderabad. They are:

Hyderabad district comprises 15 Assembly constituencies in the core of the Greater Hyderabad Municipal Corporation.

Geography 

Demographics 

In the 2011 census Hyderabad district's population was 3,943,323, with a religious make-up of: Hindus (51.45%), Muslims (43.89%), Christians (2.22%), Jains (0.5%), Sikhs (0.29%) and Buddhists (0.03%); 1.58% did not state any religion. This gives it a ranking of 57th in India (out of a total of 640). Its population growth rate over the decade 2001–2011 was 4.71%. Hyderabad has a sex ratio of 943 females for every 1000 males, and a literacy rate of 80.96%.

Language

Climate

Government 
The collectorate administers the district on behalf of the state government. The Hyderabad District does not have elected officials at the district level due to the absence of a Zilla Parishad (District Legislature) although it has representations at the state (MLA) and Union level legislature (MP). In addition the entire district is contained within the jurisdiction of the GHMC, the city administration. Representatives are popularly elected to various wards of GHMC.

References

External links

 Official website
 Hyderabad new district map with villages and mandals list 2016

 
1948 establishments in India
Districts of Telangana